Gemmuloborsonia fierstinei is an extinct species of sea snail, a marine gastropod mollusc in the family Turridae. It is the basionym of the genus.

Distribution
Fossils were found from deposits in the uppermost Pliocene to Lower Pleistocene of the Philippines. Fossils were also found in the Upper Miocene of Italy.

References

External links
 Sysoev, Alexander, and Philippe Bouchet. "Taxonomic reevaluation of Gemmuloborsonia Shuto, 1989 (Gastropoda: Conoidea), with a description of new Recent deep-water species." Journal of Molluscan Studies 62.1 (1996): 75-87

fierstinei
Gastropods described in 1989